Laska may refer to:
Laska (surname)
Lasca (or Laska), a variant of checkers
Lasca, an 1882 poem by Frank Desprez
Several places in Poland:
Laska, Chojnice County
Laska, Lębork County
Laska, West Pomeranian Voivodeship
 Lasca (film), 1919 film starring Frank Mayo